John Stafford Carson (born 29 May 1951) was Principal and Professor of Ministry at Union Theological College, Belfast, and a former moderator of the Presbyterian Church in Ireland. He took office as moderator on 1 June 2009 in succession to Dr Donald Patton. As moderator, he was awarded an honorary Doctor of Divinity degree by the Presbyterian Theological Faculty, Ireland.

In June 2013, he was appointed executive principal of Union Theological College but retired in December 2020.

References

External links
 Personal website

1951 births
Living people
Presbyterian ministers from Northern Ireland
People from Larne
People educated at Larne Grammar School
Moderators of the Presbyterian Church in Ireland
Academics of Union Theological College, Belfast